Jeff Glixman is an American record producer. He has produced, mixed or remastered artists such as Kansas, Magnum, Gary Moore, Yngwie Malmsteen, The Georgia Satellites and Black Sabbath. Combined sales of his projects exceed 30 million units.

Career
His first production was the 1975 Kansas album Song for America and he went on to produce their albums Masque (1975), Leftoverture (1976) and Point of Know Return (1977). He wrote additional lyrics on Black Sabbath's Seventh Star (1986). In addition, Glixman has worked as a mixer on 5.1 surround sound projects for the Allman Brothers' Eat a Peach and At Fillmore East, Ludacris' Chicken-n-Beer, Marvin Gaye's Let's Get It On  and Bob Marley & The Wailers' Live at Leeds, the second disc in the reissue of Burnin'.

Glixman is the Executive Vice President of StarCity Recording Company in Bethlehem, Pennsylvania, and is involved in the ownership and management of professional studios including Axis Sound Studios in Atlanta, Georgia, Caribbean Sound Basin in Trinidad and Lobo Recording Studios in Deer Park, New York.

Discography
The following is an incomplete list of the records worked on by Glixman since 1974.

References

American record producers
Living people
Year of birth missing (living people)
Place of birth missing (living people)